Norman Frederick Hetherington  (29 May 1921 – 6 December 2010) was an Australian artist, teacher, cartoonist (known as "Heth"), puppeteer, and puppet designer.

He is best remembered as the creator of one of Australia's longest running children's shows, Mr. Squiggle. Hetherington was the sole operator and voice of its star performer, the Mr. Squiggle marionette.

Family
He was the son of Frederick Hetherington (1883–1951) and Ellen Mary Hetherington (1888–1976) (née Markwell). They were married at Balmain, New South Wales in 1918, and Norman Frederick Hetherington was born on 29 May 1921 in Lilyfield.

He grew up at 35 Meryla Street, Burwood. He did his primary schooling from Burwood Public School (1927–1933), and secondary schooling at Sydney's Fort Street Boys' High School (1934–1937). He studied art, full-time, at East Sydney Technical College (now known as the National Art School), from 1937 to 1938; and, because he had taken a position with one of Sydney's largest advertising agencies, Lintas (Lever International Advertising), he transferred to part-time studies, studying at night from 1939 to 1941 (when he enlisted in the army).

He married Margaret "Peggy" Owrid (née Purnell) (1923-2022) in 1958. She would later write scripts for episodes of Mr. Squiggle. They moved to the Sydney suburb of Mosman in 1960, and Hetherington remained there until his death.

The couple's children are Stephen (b. 1959), an academic philosopher, and Rebecca (b. 1962), a television presenter (who also co-hosted Mr. Squiggle), and one-time associate producer on radio 2UE.

War service
He served with the First Australian Army Entertainment Unit during World War II, in Dutch New Guinea, New Guinea, New Britain, and the Torres Strait Islands.<ref>[http://www.abc.net.au/worldtoday/content/2005/s1451235.htm Transcript of interview with Brendan Trembath, The World Today: ABC Local Radio", Thursday, 1 September , 2005.]</ref> The Entertainment Unit also included actor Michael Pate, and comedian George Wallace Jr.

Cartoonist
He had attended classes at the National Art School before the war; and once the war was over, he continued his studies, and attended classes there four nights a week.

When he was only 15, and still a student at Fort Street Boys' High School, Hetherington sold his first cartoon to The Bulletin magazine. He contributed to The Bulletin from time to time over the next few years; and he even continued to do so whilst he was in the army.

As a freelance cartoonist he sold work to magazines that included Man, Man Junior, Army, Humour and Quiz: "His modus operandi was to approach the best-paying magazine first and continue on until he got down to the worst paying with whatever was left of his work".

He was discharged from the army in May 1946, and was immediately asked to join the full-time Bulletin staff; he continued to work for The Bulletin until 1961 (when all of the staff were sacked by Frank Packer, its new owner). He worked alongside such artists as Norman Lindsay and Percy Lindsay.

Signature

Early in his career, he signed his cartoons and caricatures with "Heth" and the last two digits of the year: a signature of, say, "Heth 42" (see advertisement at right) identifies Hetherington as the artist of the work, and 1942 as the year in which it had been drawn.

In the late 1940s, he changed his manner of signing his cartoons; it was no longer written horizontally, and it no longer displayed the year's last two digits. Whilst the signature "Heth" was still exclusively written in capital letters; it now took the form of "HETH", rather than "HETH". The letters were now rotated sideways, and the signature was written vertically running down the page from the top-left to the bottom-right (see left); and was read with one's head tilted to the right.

Many of those who were not aware of this imagined he was signing his work with (non-rotated) imitations of a number of Chinese characters, traditionally written vertically, that needed to be read with one's head tilted to the left.

Puppetry

Popular Science Monthly
His interest in marionettes began in 1935 when his father, who was the head carpenter for a major shipping line, gave him a copy of an American magazine called Popular Science Monthly, which contained instructions for making a puppet out of used bicycle inner tubes.

In a 1971 interview, he told Marie Toshack that he made his first "professional puppet" in 1952. It was a clown, made specifically for a puppet show called "The Reluctant Dragon", at the old Mercury Theatre.

Even in these first shows, critics were remarking on the "wit, whimsy, and lively inventiveness" of his performance with his marionettes, and were very impressed with the skill and craftsmanship with which his puppets had been created.

In a 1977 interview, Hetherington explained to Sue Molloy that his interest in marionettes "was the outcome of a professional interest in cartoons, and amateur interest in theatre and a hobby of puppets", remarking that, in his view, "puppets are only three-dimensional cartoons".

Clovelly Puppet Theatre
In the interview he also revealed that his burgeoning puppet hobby had been further developed, after the war, under the guidance of the psychologist, Doris Mary Matheson (1896–1969), who, along with her sister Elsie Grace Rivett (1887–1964), had founded the Children's Library and Crafts Movement in 1934 (which became the Creative Leisure Movement in 1969).

Driven by the support, encouragement and guidance of Mrs. Matheson, Hetherington became involved, along with Richard Bradshaw, and Edith Constance Murray (née Blackwell) (1897–1988), with regular performances at the sisters' Clovelly Puppet Theatre (which they had established in 1949), which staged puppet shows every Saturday, in an old army hut in Burnie Park, Clovelly.

Describing it as "a nurturing ground", Hetherington said that this was where and when his puppetry changed from being just a hobby into a lifelong interest.

Meryla Marionettes
During the 1950s, whilst pursuing his own rapidly developing personal interest in puppetry, he created a number of shows with the group he led, the Meryla Puppet Group. He was soon working on his own, as The Meryla Marionettes, with a series of shows that were very popular with children.

In November 1957, he was performing on stage for children during Saturday matinees at Sydney cinemas; and performing at three different locations on the one afternoon . Along with Igor's Puppets, the Merlya Marionettes performed on stage at the children's matinees at The Coronet Cinema, Bondi Junction, The Sixways Cinema, at Bondi, and the Randwick Cinema, at Randwick, on Saturday 23 November 1957; and at The Bondi Road Cinema, at Bondi, The Sixways Cinema, at Bondi, and The Woollahra Cinema, at Woollahra on Saturday 30 November 1957. Hetherington (assisted by Annette MacArthur-Onslow) and his puppets also performed live, on television, on Christmas Day 1957.

In the beginning, the shows were often performed at children's libraries. Hetherington was always keen to demonstrate to his young audiences just how easily puppets could be made.

From time to time, his own children participated in his performances for the Australian Theatre for Young People during the school holidays, and also in the shows that he presented at various Department Stores (Anthony Horden's, Farmer's, Grace Bros., and David Jones, etc.), such as "Enchanted Scarecrow", "The Magic Tinderbox", "The Moon for Supper" and "Nicky's Christmas Snowman".

Puppet designer
His innovative and creative design and construction skills were such that, from time to time, he was also asked to design puppets for others to operate in their own shows.

The photograph of "Smiley" on the front page of The Sydney Morning Herald of Tuesday 2 June 1970, provides a beautiful sense of just how wonderfully skilled Hetherington was in designing and constructing puppets, and the detailed, intricate nature of the mechanical devices and the special sets that he designed for his shows, and just how much children loved them.

Television
Having attended the Australian Broadcasting Corporation's (ABC) television training school some time prior to the introduction of television to Australia, Hetherington began his television career in 1956, creating Nicky and Noodle for the ABC, and another series, Jolly Gene and His Fun Machine for Channel Seven in 1957.

Mr. Squiggle
In 1958, Hetherington created Mr. Squiggle, a moon-dwelling marionette with a pencil for a nose, and the character first appeared on the Children's TV Club on ABC TV, as Mister Jolly Squiggle by "Heth". Hetherington was granted the copyright (No. 8027) for Mr. Squiggle in 1962; and his application stated that he had first created "Mr. Squiggle" on 1 August 1958). The marionette had a very heavy head, and it was always manipulated by and voiced by Hetherington himself as the sole operator. Since the images were drawn upside down, Hetherington would lie above the set in the rafters above looking down at the drawing whilst operating the marionette. The gentle politeness of Mr. Squiggle, and the gentle strength of Hetherington's well-modulated voice was immediately attractive to children, at a time when most of the other Australian TV channels had violent, raucous, and brash ventriloquist acts associated with their children's shows.

Exploiting the "fusion" of his skills as both puppeteer and cartoonist, he used the tip of the pencil that formed the puppet's nose to convert "squiggles" that had been sent in to the television station by young viewers into full-realised drawings and cartoons. Most significantly, given all of the mechanics of his marionette's performance, all of these "squiggle" conversions by Mr. Squiggle were always performed with the original children's drawing up-side down.

When asked, in 2009, in one of the "Moment in Time" segments of the ABC TV programme Can We Help?, on behalf of a viewer, Miriam Webster, whether Mr. Squiggle had lead in his pencil or whether it was "something more extraterrestrial", Norman Hetherington replied: "It started off with a very large felt pen, a very thick felt pen; but, in Studio 23, we were very close to the lights, and the heat would dry up the felt, and it wasn't very good, so we graduated to crayon, and then to oil chalk, and then [to] chalk."

Initially intended as a temporary fill-in, the show ran on ABC for 40 years, Mr. Squiggle's first appearance on ABC TV was on 1 July 1959, and he drew his last picture on ABC TV on 9 July 1999.

When interviewed by Sarah Collerton in 2009, Hetherington told her that "I taught Mr. Squiggle to draw and now he draws better than I do".

In May 1999, Mr. Squiggle was honoured by Australia Post with his own 45-cent postage stamp.

Smiley's Good Teeth Puppet Theatre
In March 1962, the Dental Health Education and Research Foundation was established at the University of Sydney to promote the philosophy and practice of preventive dentistry and, in particular, communicate positive dental health messages to the general population. Preliminary studies had convinced the Foundation that "dental health literature of a hand-out nature was virtually useless unless it was used to supplement information or knowledge already passed on to the recipient by a dentist or some other authoritative person". Moreover, it was soon found that the presence of Dental Health Educators in primary schools, instructing children up to 12 years in such things as diet, oral hygiene and plaque control, was not as effective as anticipated.

In 1967, Hetherington was consulted by the Foundation; and, with the initial notion of strongly augmenting the work of the Dental Health Educators, he was responsible for establishing the "Smiley's Good Teeth Puppet Theatre", starring a new puppet, Smiley ("a little boy who gets toothache because he has not looked after his teeth properly"), that delivered performances based on a script that had been produced in collaboration with the Foundation, that featured all of its desired preventive dentistry messages. The first performance—which, it had been decided by that time, would run "in parallel with" (rather than "as part of") the dental health educator programme—was in February 1968, with the specific target of the younger, primary school children.

The shows were performed with two puppeteers, with the assistant operating Smiley, and Hetherington everything else. The show, and its associated Good Teeth Club—to which Hetherington, having emerged from behind the puppet stage, would invite the delighted children to join at the end of each of his performances (Anon, 1970)—was immensely popular with the school children immediately it began its operation.

The Foundation was overjoyed to discover that evaluations showed that, even after six months, the children could remember 70% of the dental health messages associated with the show (Woolley, 1980).

In 1970, as part of a weekend workshop conducted by the Australian Dental Association and the Dental Health Education and Research Foundation at Sydney University, Hetherington demonstrated his work to the assembled dentists, by allowing them to observe him deliver an entire performance to a group of children from Newtown North Primary School. They were all greatly impressed with his work.

Smiley's Good Teeth Puppet Theatre operated from 1968 to 1985, and, although it began in suburban Sydney, it was making trips into the country by late 1969.

As time passed, Hetherington became less involved in the actual delivery of the performances and often hired other puppeteers to perform the shows. For the four years his son Stephen studied at Sydney University (i.e., from 1977 to 1980), Stephen worked part-time on the show as a puppeteer and was, also, the person who spoke to the children before and after each show. The other puppeteer who teamed with Stephen was Pam Sahm, who operated Smiley.

Javanese Shadow Puppet Theatre
Given his wide range of appropriate skills and experience, Hetherington was invited to work with a group of undergraduate students (ranging from second to fourth year) from the (then) Department of Indonesian and Malayan Studies at the University of Sydney, over the entire three-term year of 1980, in the task of preparing them for a performance of "Irawan Rabi", or "Irwan's Wedding", as it had been adapted for a western audience by James R. Brandon, in the manner of the traditional Javanese shadow puppet theatre (or wayang kulit). (Day, 1981).

He was asked to assist them to acquire an understanding of shadow puppet design, train them in the appropriate techniques of puppet manipulation, guide them into a smooth performance, as well as transferring an understanding of puppetry stagecraft (Day, 1981).

Apart from the extensive training he delivered to the students, and the advice that he gave to the entire company on puppetry stagecraft, he was also a very important participant in the joint construction of the final script, the musical improvisations used during the performance, and the comic routines that were woven throughout the entire performance. (Day, 1981.)

The eventual performance, the culmination of the entire year's project/course, was performed by six of the students, along with "eight-metre-high puppets made from plywood", a "life-size monster with expendable heads" and a "foam-rubber monkey".

Awards
Hetherington and his wife received several honours and awards, including the Penguin Award in 1984, and again in 1989, from the Television Society of Australia "for their outstanding contribution to children's television in Australia".

He was awarded a Medal of the Order of Australia in 1990 "for service to children's television programmes and puppetry".The Queen's Birthday 1990 Honours List: To be awarded the Medal of the Order in the General Division (OAM),  Commonwealth of Australia Gazette: Special, No. S141, (Monday, 11 Jun 1990), p.8.

In 2005, he was presented with the Dean's Award for Excellence in Art, Design and Education (College of Fine Arts, UNSW), for contribution to the media. In 1989 the Australian Cartoonists' Association presented Hetherington with a signed artist's smock; it awarded him a life membership in 2008; and [on 14 November 2009] the association presented him with the coveted Stanley Award for his outstanding contribution to Australian cartooning at the Stanley Awards ceremony in Sydney. He received a standing ovation at the presentation where many fellow cartoonists acknowledged that they were encouraged to pick up a pencil by virtue of being able to watch Mr. Squiggle's antics on television each week.

Death
After a long illness, Hetherington died on 6 December 2010 in Greenwich, Sydney.Aaron Cook, Farewell to creator of ABC's Mr. Squiggle, The Sydney Morning Herald, 7 December 2010. At his funeral, the eulogy was delivered by Richard Bradshaw.

Tributes
Many artists, cartoonists, and puppeteers have acknowledged their debt to Norman Hetherington and his work, including:
Christine Assange, Australian puppeteer.
 Peter Broelman, Australian editorial cartoonist, caricaturist and illustrator.
 Chris "Roy" Taylor, Herald-Sun cartoonist.
 Annette MacArthur-Onslow, author, illustrator of children's books, and one-time assistant to Hetherington (e.g., on Christmas Day 1957).
 Ross McCaughey, Australian cartoonist and book illustrator.
 Spare Parts Puppet Theatre.
 Hilary Talbot, Australian puppeteer and puppet designer.	
 Ben Wood, Australian book and magazine illustrator.

 Sophie Diao's Google Doodle 
In 2014, Google paid tribute to Hetherington, on his 93rd birthday, with a Google Doodle, that had been created by the Google Doodle artist Sophie Diao.

Hetherington's works

Author
 "Heth", Army Daze by Heth: From Civvy to Commando in 40 Easy Laughs, Pinnacle Press (Magpie Series), (Sydney), 1945.
 Hetherington, N., Puppets of Australia, Australian Council for the Arts, (Sydney), 1974.
 Hetherington, N. & Hetherington, M., Mr. Squiggle and the Great Moon Robbery, Australian Broadcasting Commission, (Sydney), 1980.
 Hetherington, N. & Hetherington, M., Hand Shadows, Angus & Robertson, (North Ryde), 1988.
 Hetherington, N. & Hetherington, M., Mr. Squiggle and the Preposterous Purple Crocodile, ABC Enterprises, (Sydney), 1992.

Illustrator
 Blair, D. (ed.), Blown to Blazes and Other Works of J. B. Blair, David Blair, (Sydney), 2007.
 Gardiner, S., Reflections, Wentworth Books, (Surry Hills), 1979.
 Hetherington, M., Mr. Squiggle and the Preposterous Purple Crocodile, ABC Enterprises, (Sydney), 1992.
 Hosking, C., Old Tales in a New Land: Some European Customs and Legends, Angus and Robertson, (Sydney), 1957.
 Pate, M., An Entertaining War, Dreamweaver Books, (Sydney), 1986.

Norman Hetherington was an avid supporter of the Book Collectors Society of Australia. In his memory, one of his cartoons appears on the back cover of the society journal Biblionews.

References

Further reading

 ABC Radio programme: AM: "Mr. Squiggle's creator dies": Tuesday, 7 December 2010 (Timothy McDonald, reporter).
 ABC TV programme: Australian Story: 30 October 1996: "Mr. Squiggle".
 ABC TV programme: The Collectors: 2010: Episode 21: (Friday 30 July 2010): "Mr. Squiggle". (promo: "Coming up on Collectors  . . . This weeks episode of COLLECTORS will put a smile on many a face - Mr. Squiggle drops in!")
 Anon, "Wonderbox", The Australian Women's Weekly, (Wednesday, 28 October 1964), p.17.
 Anon, "Make that third set unnecessary", The Sydney Morning Herald, (Monday, 20 October 1969, p.13.
 Anon, "All say 'cheese', please", The Sydney Morning Herald Women's Section, (Thursday, 4 June 1970), p.6.
 Bradshaw, R.,"Norman Hetherington 1921 - 2010 (Eulogy)", O.P.E.N., No. 11, (December 2010), pp.2-4.
 Camens, J. "The Mysterious Potamus", The Australian Women's Weekly, (Wednesday, 17 January 1979), p.17.
 Cochrane, P., "Maddy's Living Dangles on a Shoestring", The Sydney Morning Herald, (Monday, 2 July 1990), p. 5.
 Collerton, S., "Mr. Squiggle Rockets to 50th Birthday", ABC News Online, 2 July 2009.
 Day, A., "Reading Irawan Rabi (Irawan's Wedding)", Asian Studies Review, Vol. 5, No. 1, pp. 17–18.
 Design and Art Australia Online Biography: Norman Hetherington.
 Dunn, E. & Munro, K., "Art on a Plate", The Sydney Morning Herald, 11 November 2008.
 Foyle, L., "Creative Mind Thrilled Children", The Sydney Morning Herald, Wednesday, 8 December 2010.
 Foyle, L. & Carman, G., "Cartoonist drew Mr. Squiggle to life: Norman Hetherington, 1921-2010", The Sydney Morning Herald, Wednesday, 8 December 2010.
 Guss, Naomi, "Australian puppetry - Mr. Squiggle", School of Puppetry, 6 December 2010).
 Hetherington, N., "My Bulletin Days", 1946–1961, Biblionews and Australian Notes & Queries, No. 360, (December 2008), pp. 143–147.
 Hunter, Claire (2019), "Heth: An Artist at War", Australian War Memorial.
 Jones, M., "Mr. Squiggle Chalks Up 30 Years", The Australian Women’s Weekly, (July 1989), p. 65.
 Miner, J., "Mr. Squiggle is still drawing the children", The Sydney Morning Herald, (Wednesday, 11 July 1984), p.17.
 Molloy, Sue, "Puppets will present A Christmas Tale", The (Sydney) Sun-Herald, (Sunday, 11 December 1977), p. 197.
 Mosman Art Gallery: Tribute to Norman Hetherington, 10 December 2010.
 Musgrove, N., "Many Happy Returns to Mr. Squiggle", The Australian Women's Weekly, (Wednesday, 24 July 1974), p.57.
 O.P.E.N., Theme Issue: Norman Hetherington OAM, O.P.E.N. (Oz Puppetry Email Newsletter), No. 11, December 2010.
 Panozzo, S., "Norman Hetherington: The 2009 Stanleys: The Jim Russell Award for Outstanding Contributions to Cartooning", Inkspot, No. 60, (Summer 2009), pp.26-27.
 Pate, M., An Entertaining War, Dreamweaver Books, (Sydney), 1986.
 Perkins, M., "Mr. Squiggle rockets in", 720 ABC Perth, 4 April 2008.
 Richards, B., "Parents Guide to Holiday Fun: Stage Shows Aplenty for Kiddies", The (Sydney) Sun-Herald, (Sunday, 18 December 1977), p.110.
 Toshack, M., "Pulling the strings in a magic world", The Sydney Morning Herald, (Wednesday, 24 November 1971, p.20.
 Wilson, P.J. & Milne, G., The Space Between: The Art of Puppetry and Visual Theatre in Australia, Currency Press, (Sydney ), 2004.
 Woolley, J.M., "Changing Oral Hygiene Attitudes and Habits", International Dental Journal, Vol. 30, No. 3, (September 1980), pp. 249–256. 
 Wynhausen, E., "Mr. Squiggle's Still Sharp as he Chalks up 40", The Australian'', (Monday, 26 July 1999), p. 3.

1921 births
2010 deaths
People educated at Fort Street High School
Australian cartoonists
People from New South Wales
Australian puppeteers
Australian Army soldiers
Australian Army personnel of World War II
Recipients of the Medal of the Order of Australia
Australian caricaturists
Health education in Australia